Disco-Tex and the Sex-O-Lettes were a disco group of the 1970s, featuring Monti Rock III (born "Joseph Montanez Jr."). The band is best known for their two disco hits "Get Dancin'" and  "I Wanna Dance Wit' Choo (Doo Dat Dance)".

Career
The Sex-O-Lettes group included Bob Crewe, Cidny "Cid" Bullens (then known as Cindy Bullens), and Kenny Nolan; Sir Monti Rock III was "Disco-Tex." Their albums included a 1975 self-titled album, and Manhattan Millionaire (1976).

Their biggest hits were 1974's "Get Dancin'" (No. 10 US, No. 8 UK and Canada) and 1975's "I Wanna Dance Wit' Choo (Doo Dat Dance)" (No. 23 US, No. 6 UK). "Get Dancin'" is featured on The Simpsons episodes "Bart vs. Thanksgiving" and "I'm Goin' to Praiseland" (both times performed by fictional group 'Hooray for Everything').

"Get Dancin'" is ranked as the 82nd biggest Canadian hit of 1975, and ranks as the 100th biggest American hit of the year.

Discography

Albums

Compilation album
Get Dancin': The Story of Disco-Tex & His Sex-O-Lettes (1999, Chelsea Records / Sequel Records)

Singles

See also
List of disco artists (A–E)

References

External links
[ Disco-Tex and the Sex-O-Lettes] at AllMusic website

American disco groups
LGBT-themed musical groups